Ansan is a mountain with an elevation of  in the Seodaemun District of Seoul, South Korea. It has trail route called 'Ansan Jarak-gil' mostly made of wooden pathway, which improves accessibility for visitors. This high accessibility of trail made the Ansan Jarak-gil as South Korea's first barrier-free mountain trail.

See also 

 List of mountains in Korea
 List of mountains in Seoul
 Ansan

References 

Mountains of Seoul
Seodaemun District